Petr Nikolayevich Toburokov (25 October 1917 – 6 March 2001) was a Russian poet and writer from Yakutia.

References 

Russian male poets
1917 births
2001 deaths
20th-century Russian poets
20th-century Russian male writers